Deptford Mall is a major shopping mall in Deptford Township, New Jersey. Owned and managed by Macerich, it is the county's only indoor regional shopping center. 

The mall is anchored by Boscov's, Dick's Sporting Goods, JCPenney, Macy's, and Round 1 Entertainment. The mall has over 125 stores. It is located off of Route 42 and Route 55 at County Route 544.

History
The fully enclosed mall opened in August 1975 with three anchor stores — Sears, Bamberger's, and Wanamaker's — and 150+ specialty stores. In 1986, Bamberger's became Macy's. In 1995, the Wanamaker's store became Hecht's. Hecht's became Strawbridge's in 1996 after its parent company, May Department Stores, acquired the Strawbridge's chain. In 2000, construction began to build a JCPenney as a fourth anchor, which opened on August 1, 2001. In 2006, the Strawbridge's store closed after Federated Department Stores acquired May Department Stores; the Strawbridge's was replaced by Boscov's.

On August 5, 1996, an armed gunman attempted to rob an armored vehicle inside the mall.  During the shootout, the gunman and a 17-year-old youth were killed on the scene. A younger girl who was in critical condition after being hit by ricochet later died from her injuries at the hospital.

In January 2007, Macerich purchased the Deptford Mall for $241 million from Simon Property Group. In October 2015, Macerich sold a 49 percent stake in the Deptford Mall to Heitman.

By November 2012, the mall had completed its first renovation since the early 2000s with the vertical movement project, which involved removing the two escalators the mall had and removing stairs at each end and at the center of the mall. Escalators were added at each end of the mall, and an elevator was located in the center, with corresponding stairs.

The floor was replaced throughout the mall. New chairs, booths, and tables were added in the food court along with a children's play area (in front of Jalapeño's). Also, the up escalator in the food court (across from JCPenney) is being replaced by an up and down escalator. Originally, the Deptford Mall did not have a food court; its eating establishments were spread throughout the mall.

In 2015, Sears Holdings spun off 235 of its properties, including the Sears at Deptford Mall, into Seritage Growth Properties.

On October 15, 2018, it was announced the Sears store would be closing as part of a plan to close 142 stores nationwide as a result of the company filing for Chapter 11 bankruptcy. The store closed in January 2019.  The lower level of Sears was replaced by Dick's Sporting Goods, which relocated from its location across the street on Almonesson Road. It opened in September 2020.

In 2019, Round One Entertainment announced plans to occupy the upper level of the former Sears building by fall 2020. It opened on October 30, 2020.

Anchors
Current anchors are:
Macy's (former Bamberger's) opened 1986 - 
J. C. Penney (mall's fourth anchor) opened August 1, 2001 -   
Boscov's (former Strawbridge's) opened 2006 – 
Dick's Sporting Goods (former lower level of Sears) opened 2020
Round One Entertainment (former upper level of Sears) opened 2020

Former anchors
 Bamberger's (original anchor) opened August 1975, renamed Macy's 1986 
Sears (original anchor) opened 1975, closed 2019 –  
 Wanamaker's (original anchor) opened 1975, closed 1995
 Hecht's (former Wanamaker's) opened 1995, closed 1997
 Strawbridge's (former Hecht's) opened 1997, acquired by Federated Department Stores in 2006, converted to Boscov's

Gallery

References

External links 

International Council of Shopping Centers: Deptford Mall

Macerich
Buildings and structures in Gloucester County, New Jersey
Shopping malls in New Jersey
Tourist attractions in Gloucester County, New Jersey
Shopping malls established in 1975
Deptford Township, New Jersey